Uwe Köller (born 1964  in Neuss, West Germany) is a German trumpeter. His career began as a solo trumpeter in the Berlin Symphony Orchestra; after 1991 he was at the Deutsche Oper Berlin.  Beginning in  1995, he has been a permanent member of the group "German Brass".  Beginning in 1997,   Köller taught as a visiting professor to the University of Music and Dramatic Arts in Graz.  In 1999, he then left the German Opera Berlin to become a professor of trumpet at Graz.

References

External links
 German Brass
   Uwe Köller homepage 

1964 births
German music educators
German trumpeters
Male trumpeters
Living people
21st-century trumpeters
21st-century German male musicians
Academic staff of the Folkwang University of the Arts